Tuy Sereivathana (born 1970) is a Cambodian environmentalist who has worked to resolve conflicts between elephants and people in Cambodia. He was awarded the Goldman Environmental Prize in 2010.

In 2011, he was selected as a member of the National Geographic Emerging Explorer Program.

References 

1970 births
Living people
Cambodian environmentalists
Goldman Environmental Prize awardees